The ČD Class 242 or ZSSK Class 242 (formerly known as ČSD Class S 499.02) is a single-system AC traction electric locomotive made by Škoda Works which is operated by České dráhy. It was made between 1975 and 1981. In terms of development, it is a reconstruction of Class 240 locomotives. It goes up to 75mph (120km). It was made to operate on regional routes with a rake of 4-5 coaches like the Břeclav to Tišnov route. There are 65 of these trains in the Czech Republic and Slovakia.

References 

Locomotives of Czechoslovakia
Škoda locomotives